The Mi'kmaq Nation (formerly the Aroostook Band of Micmac) is a federally recognized tribe of Mi'kmaq people, based in Aroostook County, Maine. Their autonym is Ulustuk. Of the 28 bands of Mi'kmaq people, the Mi'kmaq Nation is the only one in the United States. The Mi'kmaq Nation were the first non-US power to sign a treaty with the United States, the Treaty of Watertown, on 6 July 1776.

The tribe has no reservation but owns  of land. An official population of 197 inhabitants was counted on the trust lands. The band is headquartered in Presque Isle. The governing council consists of nine members that serve four-year terms with the tribal chief and vice chief, along with three tribal council seats elected together and four other tribal council seats elected two years later.

They form part of a large Algonquian-speaking nation known as the Mi'kmaq. Their ancestral homeland reaches as far northeast as Newfoundland and historically includes Cape Breton Island, Nova Scotia, Prince Edward Island, a large part of New Brunswick, and a small part of Quebec in the Chaleurs Bay area.

The band was federally recognized on November 26, 1991, after a long campaign. At the time of federal recognition, the tribe was known as the Aroostook Band of Micmacs. In January 2022, the tribe officially adopted the name Mi'kmaq Nation.

See also
Maliseet

References

Federally recognized tribes in the United States
Aroostook County, Maine
Mi'kmaq in the United States